Edgware is a town in the London Borough of Barnet.

Edgware may also refer to:

Edgware tube station, the terminus for the Northern line in London
Edgware Road, which runs from Marble Arch to Edgware in London
Edgware Road tube station (Bakerloo line), on the Edgware Road
Edgware Road tube station (Circle, District and Hammersmith & City lines), also on the Edgware Road
Lord Edgware, a character in the novel Lord Edgware Dies by Agatha Christie

See also
Edgeware, suburb of Christchurch, New Zealand